This is a list of diplomatic missions in Uganda. The capital Kampala currently hosts 41 embassies/high commissions.

Diplomatic missions in Kampala

Embassies/High commissions

Other delegations or missions 
 (Delegation)

Consulate-General in Gulu

Non-resident embassies and high commissions 
Residence is in Nairobi, Kenya except noted otherwise.

 (Addis Ababa)

 (London)
 (Abu Dhabi)
 (Addis Ababa)

 (Addis Ababa)
 (Addis Ababa)
 (Valletta)

 (Dar es Salaam)
 (Addis Ababa)

 (Addis Ababa)

 (Addis Ababa)

 (Addis Ababa)

 (Addis Ababa)
 (Dar es Salaam)

Former Embassies

See also 
 Foreign relations of Uganda
 Visa requirements for Ugandan citizens

References

External links 
 Ministry of Foreign Affairs of Uganda

Uganda
Foreign relations of Uganda
Diplomatic missions